Bellacartwrightia is a relatively uncommon genus of phacopid trilobite, found in the mid-Devonian Hamilton Group of New York state, mainly in strata exposed near Lake Erie just west of Buffalo. This trilobite is usually about 1.5" to 2" long.
A very similar trilobite from the Devonian of Morocco is still sold as Metacanthina, but considerable research is still being done on Moroccan trilobites.

References

Brett, Carleton, et al., Trilobites of New York. Rochester: Rochester University Press, 2003.

Devonian trilobites of North America
Acastidae
Fossils of the United States